The Mark is a river in Belgium and the Netherlands.

Characteristics 
The Mark rises north of Turnhout, Belgium, in the municipality of Merksplas. It passes through Hoogstraten before crossing the border with the Netherlands. In the city centre of Breda it receives its main tributary Aa of Weerijs. Below Oudenbosch the Mark is known under the name Dintel. The Dintel flows into the Volkerak (part of the Rhine–Meuse–Scheldt delta) at Dintelsas.

Tributaries
 Kleine Mark (English: Little Mark)
 Merkske
 Heerlese Loop
 Strijbeekse beek
 Chaamse Beek
 Molenlei
  Aa of Weerijs
 Watermolenbeek

International rivers of Europe
Rivers of Belgium
Rivers of the Netherlands
Rivers of Antwerp Province
Rivers of North Brabant
Transport in Breda
1Mark
Merksplas